The Women's 48 kg weightlifting competitions at the 2016 Summer Olympics in Rio de Janeiro took place on 6 August at the Pavilion 2 of Riocentro.

The medals were presented by Tricia Smith, IOC member, Canada and Tamás Aján, President of International Weightlifting Federation.

Schedule
All times are Time in Brazil (UTC-03:00)

Records 
Prior to this competition, the existing world and Olympic records were as follows.

 Chen Xiexia's Olympic records in 2008 were rescinded in 2017.
 Nurcan Taylan's world record in 2010 was rescinded in 2021.

Results

References

Weightlifting at the 2016 Summer Olympics
Olymp
Women's events at the 2016 Summer Olympics